Matthew Hall McAllister (October 26, 1800 – December 19, 1865) was a United States circuit judge of the United States Circuit Court for the Districts of California.

Education and career

Born on October 26, 1800, in Savannah Georgia, the son of Matthew McAllister. McAllister attended Princeton University and read law in 1820. He entered private practice in Savannah from 1820 to 1849. He was the United States Attorney for the Southern District of Georgia from 1827 to 1834. He was a member of the Georgia State Senate from 1834 to 1837. He was Mayor of Savannah from 1837 to 1839. He was an alderman for Savannah from 1839 to 1841. He was the Democratic candidate for Governor of Georgia in 1845. He returned to private practice in San Francisco, California from 1850 to 1853. He was a Democratic candidate for United States Senator from Georgia in 1853.

Federal judicial service

He was confirmed by the United States Senate on March 3, 1855, and received his commission the same day. His service terminated on January 12, 1863, due to his resignation.

Death

McAllister died on December 19, 1865, in San Francisco.

References

Sources

 

1800 births
1865 deaths
19th-century American judges
19th-century American politicians
Georgia (U.S. state) state senators
Judges of the United States circuit courts
Mayors of Savannah, Georgia
Princeton University alumni
United States Attorneys for the Southern District of Georgia
United States federal judges appointed by Franklin Pierce
United States federal judges admitted to the practice of law by reading law